Angel Falls is the second of two waterfalls on the Angel Falls Trail in Rabun County, Georgia.  The first waterfall on the trail is Panther Falls.

References

Waterfalls of Georgia (U.S. state)
Waterfalls of Rabun County, Georgia